The 2015 Canoe Slalom World Cup was a series of five races in 5 canoeing and kayaking categories organized by the International Canoe Federation (ICF). It was the 28th edition.

Calendar 

The series opened with World Cup Race 1 in Prague, Czech Republic (June 19–21) and closed with the World Cup Final in Pau, France (August 14–16).

Final standings 
The winner of each race was awarded 60 points (double points were awarded for the World Cup Final for all the competitors who reached at least the semifinal stage). Points for lower places differed from one category to another. Every participant was guaranteed at least 2 points for participation and 5 points for qualifying for the semifinal run (10 points in the World Cup Final). If two or more athletes or boats were equal on points, the ranking was determined by their positions in the World Cup Final.

Results

World Cup Race 1 

The first race of the series took place at the Prague-Troja Canoeing Centre, Czech Republic from 19 to 21 June.

World Cup Race 2 

The second race of the series took place at the Kraków-Kolna Canoe Slalom Course, Poland from 26 to 28 June. There were no team events here.

World Cup Race 3 

The third race of the series took place at the Ondrej Cibak Whitewater Slalom Course in Liptovský Mikuláš, Slovakia from 3 to 5 July.

World Cup Race 4 

The penultimate race of the series took place at the Segre Olympic Park in La Seu d'Urgell, Spain from 7 to 9 August. There were no team events here.

World Cup Final 

The final race of the series took place at the Pau-Pyrénées Whitewater Stadium, France from 14 to 16 August.

References

External links 
International Canoe Federation

Canoe Slalom World Cup
Canoe Slalom World Cup